Niliya was King of Anuradhapura in the 1st century BC, whose reign lasted the year 47 BC. He succeeded Darubhatika Tissa as King of Anuradhapura and was succeeded by Anula.

See also
 List of Sri Lankan monarchs
 History of Sri Lanka

References

External links
 Kings & Rulers of Sri Lanka
 Codrington's Short History of Ceylon

Monarchs of Anuradhapura
N
N
N